Marta Savić (born 7 May 1966) is a Bosnian-born Serbian turbo-folk singer.

Early life
Marta Savić was born to Bosnian Serb parents in Vranjak, a village near Modriča, Bosnia and Herzegovina. At the age of two months, her family settled in the Serbian town Jaša Tomić. In 1978, the family relocated to Hannover, Germany, where she finished primary and secondary school.

Personal life
In 1988 she met singer Mile Kitić, whom she later married. Together they have a daughter named Elena (also singer). Marta Savić and Kitić live together in Belgrade, Republic of Serbia.

In January 2013, Marta Savić underwent gallbladder surgery.

Discography
Zaboravi druge žene (1988)
Proklet bio (1990)
Grešnica (1993)
Nemoj bar ti (1994)
Kad sam srela (1996)
Kad zavoliš, pa izgubiš (1999)
Dijamanti, brilijanti (2000)
Ikad ili nikad (2001)
Nismo pucali jedno u drugo (2002)
Ravno do Kosova (2003)
Erotica [featured at official website] (2006)
Muški kompleksi (2009)
13 (2011)

References

External links

1966 births
Living people
People from Modriča
20th-century Serbian women singers
Serbian turbo-folk singers
20th-century Bosnia and Herzegovina women singers
Bosnia and Herzegovina turbo-folk singers
Bosnia and Herzegovina folk-pop singers
Grand Production artists
Musicians from Hanover